Olena Kuchma Pinchuk (Olena Leonidivna Pinchuk; born December 3, 1970; often written in the Russian form Елена Пинчук, Elena Pinchuk) is the daughter of Ukrainian second president Leonid Kuchma, founder of ANTIAIDS Foundation, and Head of the Supervisory Board of the biggest Ukrainian media group, StarLightMedia.

Biography 
Olena Pinchuk was born on December 3, 1970 in Dnipropetrovsk (now known as Dnipro). She attended physicotechnical and economics faculties at Dnipropetrovsk National University, and graduated in "Economics and Sociology". Within 1995-1996, she worked in Department for economics at PrivatBank. From 1997 - 2002, she was the marketing director of Kyivstar. In 2003, she founded ANTIAIDS Foundation, aimed at fighting AIDS epidemic in Ukraine. It is the first and only Ukrainian charity fund that exists thanks to the private funds and donations. The Foundation is widely known for the national media promotional campaigns and attracting Ukrainian and international celebrities to the problem.

In 2010, she joined the UNAIDS High Level Commission on HIV Prevention.

Honours 
 November 2007 - ranked the 17th among 100 most influential Ukrainian women, according to Ukrainian magazine Focus
 December 2012 - 3rd place at the same rating

Personal life 
Pinchuk's father is the second President of Ukraine, Leonid Kuchma. Her mother, Lyudmyla Kuchma, is the Honorary President of the National Fund of Social Protection of Mothers and Children "Ukraine to Children". Elena Pinchuk was married to Igor Franchuk, an MP in the Ukraine up to mid-1997 and has a son with him (Roman, born on April 3, 1991). In 2002, she married Viktor Pinchuk, Ukrainian businessman and philanthropist. They have two daughters, Katerina (born in 2003) and Veronika (2011).

In 2008, she bought a 10-bedroom villa in Upper Phillimore Gardens, Kensington, London for £80 million - at the time the most expensive home in the UK.

References

External links
 Official website of ANTIAIDS Foundation

Businesspeople from Dnipro
Living people
1970 births
Kuchma family
Ukrainian mass media owners
Ukrainian philanthropists
HIV/AIDS activists
Ukrainian businesspeople in the United Kingdom
Oles Honchar Dnipro National University alumni
Ukrainian women philanthropists